Svenska Cupen 2010 was the 55th season of the main Swedish football Cup. AIK were the defending champions.

Preliminary round
52 teams from Division 1 2010 or lower of the Swedish league pyramid competed in this round.

!colspan="3"|3 March 2010

|-
!colspan="3"|6 March 2010

|-
!colspan="3"|11 March 2010

|-
!colspan="3"|13 March 2010

|-
!colspan="3"|17 March 2010

|-
!colspan="3"|19 March 2010

|-
!colspan="3"|20 March 2010

|-
!colspan="3"|21 March 2010

|-
!colspan="3"|23 March 2010

|-
!colspan="3"|24 March 2010

|}

Round 1
Twelve teams from Division 1 2010 or lower, two of the three teams which earned promotion to 2010 Superettan (not IK Brage) and the bottom eight teams from 2009 Superettan entered in this round. They were joined by the 26 preliminary round winners.

!colspan="3"|18 March 2010

|-
!colspan="3"|27 March 2010

|-
!colspan="3"|28 March 2010

|-
!colspan="3"|30 March 2010

|-
!colspan="3"|31 March 2010

|}

Round 2
Two demoted teams from 2009 Allsvenskan and six teams ranked 3rd through 8th in 2009 Superettan entered in this round, joining 24 winners from Round 1.

!colspan="3"|7 April 2010

|-
!colspan="3"|9 April 2010

|-
!colspan="3"|11 April 2010

|-
!colspan="3"|14 April 2010

|-
!colspan="3"|17 April 2010

|-
!colspan="3"|18 April 2010

|-
!colspan="3"|21 April 2010

|-
!colspan="3"|22 April 2010

|}

Round 3
Sixteen teams from 2010 Allsvenskan entered in this round, and joined the 16 winners of Round 2.

!colspan="3"|18 May 2010

|-
!colspan="3"|19 May 2010

|-
!colspan="3"|25 May 2010

|-
!colspan="3"|3 June 2010

|}

Round 4
The sixteen winning teams from round 3.

!colspan="3"|27 June 2010

|-
!colspan="3"|1 July 2010

|-
!colspan="3"|2 July 2010

|-
!colspan="3"|4 July 2010

|-
!colspan="3"|5 July 2010

|}

Quarter-finals

Semi-finals

Final

External links
 Official site 

2010
Cupen
2010 domestic association football cups